General Reinhardt may refer to:

Alfred-Hermann Reinhardt (1897–1973), German Wehrmacht lieutenant general
Emil F. Reinhardt (1888–1969), U.S. Army major general
Georg-Hans Reinhardt (1887–1963), German Wehrmacht colonel general
Klaus Reinhardt (born 1941), German Army general
Walther Reinhardt (1872–1930), Imperial German Army general of the infantry

See also
Hans-Wolfgang Reinhard (1888–1950), German Wehrmacht general of the infantry
Wilhelm Reinhard (SS officer) (1869–1955), German Schutzstaffel general
Stanley Eric Reinhart (1893–1975), U.S. Army major general